Matt Morencie (born December 28, 1987) is a former professional Canadian football offensive lineman. He was drafted by the BC Lions in the third round of the 2009 CFL Draft. He played CIS football for the Windsor Lancers.

External links
Winnipeg Blue Bombers bio

1987 births
Canadian football offensive linemen
Living people
Players of Canadian football from Ontario
Sportspeople from Windsor, Ontario
Windsor Lancers football players
Winnipeg Blue Bombers players